Ireland competed at the 1956 Summer Olympics in Melbourne, Australia and Stockholm, Sweden (equestrian events). Until 2012, it was the nation's most successful Olympic performance, with five medals, three bronze, a silver and a gold.

Medalists
Ireland finished in 21st position in the final medal rankings, with one gold medal and five medals overall. It was the first time Ireland would win medals at two different sports, and the five was a record total for an Irish team at the Olympic Games. This record stood until the 2012 London Olympics, where Ireland won six medals.

Gold
 Ronnie Delaney — Athletics, Men's 1500 m

Silver
 Fred Tiedt — Boxing, Men's Welterweight

Bronze
 John Caldwell — Boxing, Men's Flyweight
 Fred Gilroy — Boxing, Men's Bantamweight
 Anthony Byrne — Boxing, Men's Lightweight

Results by event

Athletics
Men's 110m Hurdles 
Eamonn Kinsella
 Heat — 14.6s (→ did not advance)

Wrestling
Men's Light-Heavyweight, Freestyle
Gerry Martina 4th

References

Nations at the 1956 Summer Olympics
1956
1956 in Irish sport